The Joseph and Minnie White House is a historic home at 243 Hazelwood Avenue in Middlesex, Middlesex County, New Jersey.
The house was added to the National Register of Historic Places on October 28, 1988, for its significance in architecture and photojournalism as the childhood home of Margaret Bourke-White. It was built in 1905 with American Craftsman style.

References

External links
 

Middlesex, New Jersey
National Register of Historic Places in Middlesex County, New Jersey
New Jersey Register of Historic Places
Houses on the National Register of Historic Places in New Jersey
Houses in Middlesex County, New Jersey
Houses completed in 1905
American Craftsman architecture in New Jersey